Lo-Tech Man, Hi-Tech World is second album by Hungarian band Neo. It contains more pop/rock influences than their debut, Eklektogram. "Diskhead" and "Everybody Come On" were singles from this album. "Everybody Come on" and "Renard" were also used in the movie Kontroll, for which Neo created the soundtrack.

Track listing
 Pointless Lowlands (2:03)
 Explode Your World (4:41)
 Clear And Clean (5:12)
 C'mon It's Time (5:29)
 Lo-Tech Man, Hi-Tech World (5:03)
 2 & 3 (3:37)
 A Freeze Frame Of Mind (2:06)
 Diskhead (3:16)
 Come Down (7:01)
 Renard (6:20)
 Everybody Come On (7:45)
 Rise (19:46)

Songs Renard, Everybody Come On, Pointless Lowlands and the hidden track of Come Down were used in movie Kontroll
Rise ends at 7:03, after silence 12+ more minutes of ambient sounds follow.

Personnel
Producer, Mixed By, Programmed By - Márk Moldvai, Mátyás Milkovics
Vocals, Lyrics By, Guitar - Krisztián Szűcs
Flute in Pointless Lowlands, gadulka performer in Renard - András Monori
Bass in Explode Your World and C'mon It's Time - Tamás Barabás
Guitar in Explode Your World and Rise - Ciba
Bass in Clear And Clean, Renard and Rise - András Jeli
Vocals in Diskhead - Péter Újvári
Vocals in Renard - Bori Kesei
Drums in Rise - Gyb
Pannonpipe performer in Rise - Norbert Babos

2002 albums
Neo (Hungarian band) albums